Larry Mathews (born Larry Mazzeo August 15, 1955, in Burbank, California) is an American actor known for his role as Ritchie Petrie on The Dick Van Dyke Show.

After the series ended in 1966, Larry Mathews left acting to pursue a more conventional childhood and graduated from the University of California, Los Angeles in 1976. He has worked as an account executive and appeared on numerous television programs to discuss his role on The Dick Van Dyke Show.

Mathews reprised the role of Ritchie on The Dick Van Dyke Show Revisited (2004).

References

External links 

1955 births
Living people
American male child actors
American male television actors
Male actors from Burbank, California
University of California, Los Angeles alumni